Arthur Murdoch (14 January 1882 – 5 October 1960) was a British boxer. He competed in the men's middleweight event at the 1908 Summer Olympics.

Murdoch won the Amateur Boxing Association 1906 middleweight title, when boxing out of the Belsize ABC.

References

External links
 

1882 births
1960 deaths
British male boxers
Olympic boxers of Great Britain
Boxers at the 1908 Summer Olympics
Place of birth missing
Middleweight boxers